Steak 'n Shake Operations, Inc. (doing business as Steak 'n Shake) is an American casual restaurant chain concentrated primarily in the Midwestern United States with locations also in the South, Mid-Atlantic and Western United States, Europe, and the Middle East. The company is headquartered in Indianapolis, Indiana, and is a wholly owned subsidiary of Biglari Holdings. , 628 Steak 'n Shake restaurants were in operation, with 414 of them corporate-owned, and 214 franchised. The company has since attempted to convert to a fully franchised model. Typical restaurant locations have sit-down, drive-thru and front-window service, resulting in a hybrid of fast-food to-go and diner-style sit-down service. Many locations are open 24 hours a day, seven days per week. The menu features primarily burgers and hand-dipped milkshakes; other entrees, side items, and drinks are also available.

The corporation's slogan, "Famous for Steakburgers", refers to its most prominent food item, the Steakburger. The "steak" in the restaurant name comes from that menu item.

History
A. H. "Gus" Belt (born in Morrisonville, Illinois) founded Steak 'n Shake in Normal, Illinois, in February 1934, after serving four years in the United States Marine Corps. He converted the combination gas station and chicken restaurant that he owned (Shell's Chicken) into a hamburger stand.

Steak 'n Shake's slogan, "In Sight It Must Be Right", originally referred to Belt's practice of wheeling a barrel of T-bone, sirloin, and round steaks into the public area of his restaurant, then grinding them into burgers in front of his customers—a practice intended to reassure customers of the product's wholesomeness as, at the time, ground beef was still viewed with skepticism by the general public, based on the likelihood of its having impurities deliberately added to it. This also assured Belt's customers of the veracity of his "Steakburger" claim. Later, patrons were assured that Steakburgers were still made from these ingredients "at our own commissary" for shipment to the restaurants, where the open grill line remained "in sight" to customers.

Following the restaurant's success, Belt purchased a chain of Goal Post restaurants throughout central Illinois, converting them to Steak 'n Shakes, and added curb service to them.

The original building at the intersection of Main Street and West Virginia Avenue was damaged by a fire in the early 1960s, but was repaired and its dining room expanded. In the late 1990s, Steak 'n Shake sold the building to the Monical's Pizza company.

After Gus Belt
Steak 'n Shake continued to expand throughout Illinois following Belt's death in 1954. Ownership passing through many hands, including Gus's wife Edith, who ran the chain until 1969; Longchamps, Inc., an East Coast steakhouse company that owned the chain from 1969 to 1971; and Indianapolis-based Franklin Corporation, led by Robert Cronin, author of Selling Steakburgers: The Growth of a Corporate Culture. After the acquisition, Franklin moved Steak 'n Shake's headquarters from Normal, Illinois to Indianapolis.

In 1981, Steak 'n Shake and its parent company Franklin were acquired by E. W. Kelley and Associates, whose chairman E. W. "Ed" Kelley was responsible for the restaurant chain until his death on July 4, 2003.

Under Sardar Biglari
Entrepreneur Sardar Biglari took control of Steak 'n Shake in August 2008 after three years of declining same-store sales and losses of $100,000 per day. He led a turnaround that resulted in 24 straight quarters of increases in same-store sales and profits of $100,000 per day. He focused the brand on burgers, fries and milkshakes, reducing the menu from eight pages to a bi-fold.  However, the chain ran into more problems in 2016 and onward, with revenue declining sharply.  Reasons included under-investment in the restaurants after the deep price cuts of 2008; competition from "fast casual" restaurants like Chipotle, that aimed for a more high-class experience; and two expensive lawsuits from former managers who accused the chain of misclassifying them as salaried employees and refusing to pay earned overtime.

In 2018, Steak 'n Shake changed its business model to a franchise partner system, with Biglari attempting to turn all of the 400+ company-owned restaurants into franchise operations. Entrepreneurial single-unit operators could take control of an existing Steak 'n Shake for $10,000, an unusually low price, but were required to give the company 50% of the restaurant's profits. Despite the new franchise inducement, the firm remained heavily indebted. As of April 2020, its debt was rated as a low C/D "speculative" grade (colloquially known as junk bonds) by bond rating agencies.  The Washington Post considered the chain extremely likely to default with a low likelihood of recovering, with the restaurant closings due to the COVID-19 pandemic in the United States being an unrecoverable blow to the firm.

Locations

The first Steak 'n Shake in the state of Indiana was opened as a drive-in restaurant in Indianapolis in November 1954. As typical for this time period, it had offered curb (carhop) service in addition to table service and takeout. At the time of its opening, Steak 'n Shake had locations in five states.

The Route 66 Steak 'n Shake at Springfield, Missouri (built 1962) was listed on the National Register of Historic Places in 2012.

The company entered North Carolina for the first time by opening a franchised location in Greensboro in December 1996.

Steak 'n Shake entered Wisconsin with locations in Racine, Janesville and Madison in the late 1990s, but all locations closed by 2004. Another franchiser opened locations in Waukesha and Wauwatosa in 2007, but both closed by 2010. The chain has yet to return to the state.

After briefly operating a few restaurants in south Texas during the 1970s, Steak 'n Shake returned to Texas by opening locations in the Dallas–Fort Worth area beginning in 2001, in the Houston area beginning in 2012, and in the San Antonio area beginning in 2013.
Steak 'n Shake entered South Carolina for the first time by opening a location in Greenville in February 2001.
The company entered Oklahoma for the first time by opening a franchised location in Edmond in 2004.
Steak 'n Shake entered West Virginia for the first time by opening a franchised location in Barboursville in August 2007.

Steak 'n Shake opened their first location in Nevada inside the South Point Casino in Las Vegas, Nevada in July 2010 and a second Nevada location in Reno in July 2013. In January 2017, a second location was opened in Las Vegas, the third in Nevada, in the Student Union building on the campus of the University of Nevada, Las Vegas followed by a second Reno location, the fourth in Nevada, in July 2017.
Steak 'n Shake entered Louisiana for the first time by opening a location near Baton Rouge in Covington in 2011.
The company first entered Colorado via a franchise in Denver in November 2011 before the parent took over the Colorado locations after a lengthy lawsuit between the franchisee and the parent company.
In January 2012, they opened their first and only location in the state of New York on the island of Manhattan in New York City, adjacent to the Ed Sullivan Theater, then home to the Late Show with David Letterman. Indiana native David Letterman, an avid Steak 'n Shake fan, would frequent the location and mention it often on his show. This location closed in October 2017, ending the chain's five year presence in the state.
The first location in New Jersey was opened by a franchise holder in September 2012 in Paramus. 
At the beginning of 2016, a second and third location within New Jersey were opened by the same franchisee in West Windsor Township and Hamilton Township, but both of those locations quietly disappeared within a year. In September 2017, the original Paramus location, the last location in New Jersey, also closed after a five-year struggle to remain in business.

The first Steak 'n Shake location in the state of Arizona was opened in Tempe in October 2013.
 A second Arizona location was open on the campus of the University of Arizona in Tucson in July 2017.

The first and only location in the state of Montana, and in the upper plain states, was opened in Billings in December 2013. This location was forced to close after two and a half years in July 2016 due to poor sales that were blamed on "harsh reviews on social media".

Steak 'n Shake expanded to California in July 2014 by opening a location in Victorville. A Los Angeles County location was opened in Santa Monica in late October and another in Burbank in December. After a lack of activity for over a year in the highly competitive Californian marketplace, the company announced in April 2016 of the expected opening of their first Orange County location, their fourth in California, in Aliso Viejo in mid-May. After a short delay, a fifth California location was opened behind schedule in Riverside in August 2016. In March 2017, a 6th location opened in Yucca Valley. After 3.5 years of operation, the Victorville location closed abruptly in February 2018 after receiving an eviction notice for failure to pay rent.

In 2015, the company planned a restaurant in Northern California in Campbell, California, but local residents delayed it. Because of that delay, the first location in Northern California opened instead in Daly City in November 2016. This opening was followed by the opening of the first Central California location in Fresno in March 2017. A second San Francisco Bay Area restaurant was opened on the campus of San Jose State University (SJSU) in July 2017. After a long four delay fighting local anti-development activists, the company finally opened their long expected restaurant in Campbell in September 2017. After four months of operation, the Daly City location closed along with the Campbell location in January 2018. This leaves only San Jose location on the campus of SJSU as the only Bay Area store. After 10 months of operation, the lone Central California location in Fresno also closed in January 2018.
 
In June 2015, the first location in Maryland opened in Millersville. Two years later, the struggling Maryland franchisee filed for voluntary bankruptcy in June 2017 while still remaining open. This location finally closed in January 2018 after the Circuit Court for Anne Arundel County seized the restaurant for non-payment on loans and taxes. The restaurant and contents were auctioned off by the court on January 31, 2018. Later that year, the franchise owner was arrested after FBI filed an indictment against the franchise owner for plotting to kill his wife and to burn the restaurant down in an attempt to receive insurance money for his then failing business. In January 2019, the restaurant has reopened under new management. In April 2019, the same franchise owner of the Millersville location announced plans to open a second location in White Marsh by summer 2019.

The first location in the Pacific Northwest opened in Seattle, Washington in May 2016; it went defunct after four years.

In September 2018, the first location in the state of Delaware was opened in Middletown.

In March 2019, the first location in the state of Nebraska was opened on the campus of University of Nebraska–Lincoln.

In March 2019, Steak 'n Shake announced plans to open its first restaurant in Washington, D.C., inside the Rayburn House Office Building to serve House members, staffers, and the public who pass "through security and a metal detector". The location officially opened for business in the first week of September 2019.
And come January 11, 2021, the first Steak N Shake location in the Des Moines Suburb of West Des Moines opened, joining seven other stores in Iowa, with strict measures, like no eat-in dining.

International expansion
In December 2013, Steak 'n Shake opened a corporate office in Monte Carlo, Monaco, to support its expansion in West Asia and Europe.

West Asia
In October 2012, Steak 'n Shake announced its first international expansion agreement with plans to open forty locations in the United Arab Emirates. The first of these locations opened in Dubai in 2013, but closed in a little more than a year. Ultimately, only two out of the original  40 locations planned were opened in the United Arab Emirates. Both closed in January 2015.

The brand also announced in December 2013 a 50-unit franchise agreement in Saudi Arabia with AB Holdings. The first location in Riyadh was expected to open in the first half of 2014.

The first location in the Persian Gulf country of Kuwait was opened in December 2014. This location appeared to have been closed after less than three years of operation.

The first location in Qatar opened at the Tawar Mall in November 2017.

Europe
The first two European locations opened in Cannes, France, in May 2014 and on the island of Ibiza in Spain in June 2014.

The second location in France was opened in Marseille in December 2014. A third location in France was opened in Toulon in April 2016 and was quickly followed in June by the openings of a fourth and fifth locations in Caen and Rueil-Malmaison, in October by the openings of a sixth location at the Cité Europe shopping centre in Coquelles, and in November of a seventh location in Fenouillet. The eighth and ninth location in France were open in Bordeaux and Anglet respectively in early 2017. A second location in Marseille was opened in December 2017. A third location in Marseille, the 17th location in France, was opened in May 2018.

The second location in Spain was opened in the capital Madrid in September 2015 followed by a third location in Churra, Murcia in October 2015.

The first location in Italy opened in Milan in December 2015. A second location was opened in Peschiera del Garda in May 2016. A third location was opened in Castione Andevenno in September 2016.

In July 2016, the first location in Portugal opened in Montijo, near Lisbon.

In December 2016, the first store in the United Kingdom opened in Chester, Cheshire, England. The only location within the UK was closed 21 months later in August 2018.

Controversies

Franchise pricing lawsuits
Between 2010 and 2015, Steak 'n Shake became involved in lawsuits with several of its franchisees concerning mandatory menu prices and mandatory food sourcing.  , five lawsuits had been filed.  The first lawsuit began in 2010 and is by Stuller, Inc., the Illinois franchisee that is the oldest franchisee in Steak 'n Shake's history. Stuller won a preliminary injunction that went to the 7th Circuit Court of Appeals in August 2012.  Three more franchisees filed suit in April 2013—Druco Restaurants based in St. Louis, People Sales & Profit Co. based in Georgia, and Scott's S&S Inc. in Pennsylvania. A settlement was reached with these franchisees in 2014, but terms of the settlement were not made public.

Steak 'n Shake filed suit against Denver franchisees Larry and Christopher Baerns in July 2013 over the same issues, with a counterclaim soon after. Steak 'n Shakes won their lawsuit in U.S. District Court against the Baerns when judge ruled that the Baerns intentionally overcharged customers.  The complaints by the franchisees also question whether Steak 'n Shake promised franchise results that could never actually be achieved under its policies.

Employee classification lawsuits
286 managers in the St. Louis area filed and won a lawsuit against Steak 'n Shake on grounds that they were misclassified as exempt employees unable to earn overtime.  Steak 'n Shake had to pay $7.7 million in damages.  They were sued again by an even larger group of 1100+ managers on similar grounds; as of 2019, that case was pending.

See also
 List of hamburger restaurants

References

External links

 

1934 establishments in Illinois
Companies based in Indianapolis
Restaurants in Indianapolis
Economy of the Midwestern United States
Economy of the Southeastern United States
Fast-food hamburger restaurants
Regional restaurant chains in the United States
Restaurant chains in the United States
Restaurants established in 1934
Restaurants in Illinois
2008 mergers and acquisitions